or  is a style of obfuscated (cant) Japanese writing popular amongst urban Japanese youth. As the name  suggests ( meaning "gal"), this writing system was created by and remains primarily employed by young women.

Like the English phenomenon of SMS language, it is most often used for sending cell phone text messages, but while text is used as a form of informal shorthand, a message typed in  usually requires more characters and effort than the same message typed in plain Japanese. Since writing in  requires extra effort, and due to the perception of confidentiality, sending  messages to a peer is seen as a sign of informality or friendship. The origin of this style is unclear but it has been proposed that magazines targeted at teenage girls first made it popular, and the phenomenon started to gain wider attention in media around 2002.

The style has been met with increasing criticism, as its use continues to expand. Reported instances of girls using the writing in school work, OLs ("office ladies") adopting the style in the workplace, and  being used in karaoke subtitling, are examples of this. Anthropologist Laura Miller has analyzed  as an example of gender resistance.

Several online guides for  exist, as well as one published book:  (2004).

Formation
Like leet,  replaces characters with visually similar characters or combinations of characters. The Japanese language consists of traditional characters of Chinese origin, kanji, and two native syllabic scripts called kana: hiragana and katakana. These characters and scripts are altered to form hidden messages. Hiragana consisting of connected strokes are replaced by symbols or Greek letters: for example,  may be rendered as the section symbol §. Hiragana consisting of detached elements are replaced by sequences of kana, Western letters, or symbols. For example,  may be typed as |ま (vertical bar and hiragana ) or (ま (open parenthesis and ),  may be typed as レナ (katakana ), Iナ (capital i), or († (open parenthesis, dagger), and  may be typed as ナ= (katakana , equals sign) or †こ (dagger, hiragana ).

Kana and rōmaji may be mixed freely, even within a word, and Latin letters in rōmaji may be replaced with similar-looking Cyrillic letters, such as replacing N with И (Cyrillic I). Compound kanji are decomposed into left and right elements, which are written as individual kanji or kana.

In addition to the basic obfuscation provided by character replacement, another technique used to disguise the content of the message is to use vocabulary and grammar that is uncharacteristic of standard usage. Combined with character substitution, this can make the meaning of the message almost unintelligible to those not "in the know". This is analogous to the use of leet's specialized grammar. However, the flexible nature of the Japanese language means that although  phrases sound peculiar to someone expecting formal or even commonly colloquial Japanese, they are often technically still grammatically correct.

For example, the sentence  is "Right now I am feeling very good." in standard normal-polite Japanese.

Conversion chart
The original Japanese hiragana followed by romaji, and then various versions of the Japanese character in gyaru moji. The following chart is also available in image form.

あ a：　ぁ・ァ・了
い i：　ぃ・ィ・ﾚヽ・ﾚ丶・レ）・ﾚ`・L丶・Lヽ
う u：　ぅ・ゥ・宀・ヴ
え e：　ぇ・ェ・之・工・ヱ
お o：　ぉ・ォ・才・汚
か ka：　ｶゝ・ｶ丶・ｶヽ・ｶ`・ｶゞ【が】
き ki：　(ｷ・(≠・L≠・‡
く ku：　＜・〈・勹
け ke：　ヶ・(ﾅ・ﾚ†・ﾚﾅ・|ナ・l+・Iﾅ
こ ko：　〓・=・]・⊃
さ sa：　廾・±・(十・L+
し shi：　ι・∪
す su：　￡
せ se：　世・Ш
そ so：　ξ・ζ・`ﾉ・丶/・ヽ丿
た ta：　ﾅ=・+=・†ﾆ・ﾅﾆ
ち chi：　干・千・于・5
つ tsu：　っ・ッ・⊃
て te：　τ・〒
と to：　┠・┝・┣・├
な na：　ﾅょ・十ょ・†ょ・ﾅg
に ni：　(ﾆ・|=・丨ﾆ・L=・I=・
ぬ nu：　йu
ね ne：　йё
の no：　/・丿・σ
は ha：　ﾊ〃【バ】・ﾊo【パ】・'`・八・l￡・(￡・ﾉ|・ﾉl・ﾚ￡
ひ hi：　ﾋ〃【ビ】・ﾋo【ピ】・匕
ふ fu：　ﾌ〃【ブ】・ﾌo【プ】・ヴ
へ he：　ﾍ〃【べ】・ﾍo【ペ】・～
ほ ho：　ﾎ〃【ボ】・ﾎo【ポ】・朮
ま ma：　ма・мα
み mi：　彡
む mu：　￡′・厶
め me：　×・x・χ・乂
も mo：　м○・мσ
や ya：　ゃ・ャ
ゆ yu：　ゅ・ュ・ф
よ yo：　ょ・ョ・∋・чｏ
ら ra：　яа
り ri：　L|・l)・ﾚ｣・ﾚ)・┗』・└丿
る ru：　ゐ・ゑ・儿・lﾚ・｣レ
れ re：　яё
ろ ro：　з・З・□・回
わ wa：　ゎ・ヮ・wα
を wo：　щo
ん n：　ω・冫・ｗ・h
ー (long vowel mark)：　→・⇒

Compound kanji
Here are some examples of  created from compound kanji. The kanji characters are followed by their reading and meaning, and the  derived from them:

  → 
  → 
  →

Examples

Cultural attitudes 
As a youth culture element produced by women,  is not well received by the older Japanese public. From a traditionalist perspective,  rejects the elegant, painstaking brushstrokes of Japanese writing embraced by the art of Japanese calligraphy. From a contemporary perspective,  may be likened to other, comical recent scripts, such as the bubble-like  from the 1980s. However, this innovative writing system subverts cultural norms and breaks linguistic barriers, characterizing  with a rebellious nature.

See also

Japanese typographic symbols for explanations of some of the above Japanese symbols.
Martian language, a similar phenomenon in the Chinese language.
Emoji

References

External links
Japanese girls devise their own written language

Japanese popular culture
Japanese writing system
Mobile phone culture
Cant languages
Gyaru
Gender in language
Japanese words and phrases